Eldridge Wayne Coleman (born June 7, 1943), better known by his ring name "Superstar" Billy Graham, is an American retired professional wrestler. He gained recognition for his tenure as the WWWF Heavyweight Champion in 1977–1978. He is a three-time world champion in major professional wrestling promotions. As an award-winning bodybuilder, he was a training partner and close friend of Arnold Schwarzenegger. He is most remembered for revolutionizing the interview and physique aspects of the professional wrestling industry, and for his charismatic performance style. Some of his wrestling protégés include Hulk Hogan, Jesse Ventura, and Ric Flair.

Early life 
Coleman was born into a working-class family in Phoenix, Arizona, on June 7, 1943. His father was from Mississippi, and his mother, who claimed Cherokee ancestry, was from Arkansas. Coleman was attracted to weight lifting in the fifth grade. As a teenager he was an avid reader of bodybuilding magazines, his idols being Steve Reeves and John Grimek. As a teenager, he became a devout Christian and traveled to religious revivals where he incorporated feats of strength into his sermons.

Coleman was a shot put champion in high school. He also dabbled in amateur and professional boxing, participating in the 1959 Golden Gloves. At age 26, he tried out for the Canadian Football League's Calgary Stampeders but was traded to the Montreal Alouettes. He played in only a couple of games. In between football engagements, he worked as a bouncer in various nightclubs in Phoenix, New York and Los Angeles.

Bodybuilding career 
In 1961 Coleman was the winner of the West Coast division of the Mr. Teenage America bodybuilding contest (Frank Zane winning in the East Coast division), and his photo appeared soon after in Bob Hoffman's Strength and Fitness magazine. Coleman began to train intensively in 1968 at Gold's Gym in Santa Monica, where he worked out with Dave Draper, Franco Columbu and Arnold Schwarzenegger. At this time he was able to bench press 605 lbs (the world record, held by his friend Pat Casey, was 616 lbs). One of Coleman's photo shoots with Schwarzenegger was featured that year in Joe Weider's Muscle Fitness magazine.

When Coleman decided to become a professional wrestler two years later, he had the inspiration of marrying wrestling to bodybuilding. As a wrestler he weight-trained continually, and in 1975 prepared for the World Bodybuilding Guild's Pro. Mr. America contest in New York City, where his 22-inch biceps won first place in the Best Developed Arms division. At the peak of his wrestling career in 1977, Coleman weighed 275 lbs. From 1978 he gained more weight and in 1980, at 325 lbs, he took part in the World's Strongest Man competition in Great Gorge, New Jersey. He finished seventh in this contest in spite of injuring himself in one of the events. On December 6 of the same year Coleman hosted the U.S. Invitational Powerlifting Championship in Phoenix, Arizona.

Professional wrestling career

Early years (1969–1972) 
In 1969, Coleman was encouraged by professional wrestler Bob Lueck to train with Stu Hart for the latter's Stampede Wrestling promotion. He trained under Hart in Calgary before debuting on January 16, 1970 in a match with Dan Kroffat. After wrestling briefly under his real name, Coleman traveled back to the United States in May, wrestling for a few months with Dr. Jerry Graham, Brick Darrow, Rick Cahill and Ron Pritchard in Arizona before he and Jerry Graham joined the National Wrestling Alliance's Los Angeles promotion (run by Mike LeBell) as a tag team the following August. He changed his ring name to Billy Graham, as a tribute to the famous evangelist of the same name. Later, while wrestling in Championship Wrestling from Florida, the name would serve both as his ring name and to make him the (kayfabe) youngest brother of Jerry and the other Graham Brothers (Eddie and Luke).

In late December 1970 Graham went north to join Roy Shire's NWA San Francisco promotion, working with Pat Patterson (his tag-team partner), Ray Stevens, Cyclone Negro, and Peter Maivia. Graham's nearly two-year run in central California included a stint wrestling in Hawaii in February and March 1972. It was during his Californian period that Graham developed a new aspect of his character; before a match he would stage an arm wrestling contest, encouraging public challenges to his title of "Arm Wrestling Champion of the World".

American Wrestling Association (1972–1975) 
On October 2, 1972, Graham premiered in Verne Gagne's American Wrestling Association (AWA) based in Minneapolis, where he took on the moniker "Superstar". As he toured the north-central states and adjacent areas of Canada, Graham feuded with Gagne, The Crusher, The Bruiser, Wahoo McDaniel, Billy Robinson, Ken Patera and Ivan Koloff, the latter becoming his tag-team partner. By this time, Graham was integrating into his performances not only arm wrestling contests but also weightlifting challenges (mainly involving ex-Olympian Ken Patera) and posing routines. One of his most memorable feuds was against McDaniel, with whom he wrestled numerous bouts with between 1973 and 1974. Among the matches they participated in were Indian Strap matches. It was during the feud with McDaniel that Superstar also teamed with Koloff to take on McDaniel and The Crusher in tag team matches. It was also during his time in the AWA that he began wrestling Ivan Putski.

In September and October 1974 Graham took leave from the AWA to join the International Wrestling Alliance's "Super Wide Series" tour of Japan, where he fought such local stars as Mighty Inoue, Animal Hamaguchi and Rusher Kimura. Following his return from Japan, Graham formed a tag team with Dusty Rhodes. He left the AWA and returned to the NWA in May 1975, signing up with Red Bastien's Dallas-based promotion for five months and taking the local "Brass Knucks" title from Mad Dog Vachon on August 8. For most of October, Graham worked for the Mid Atlantic promotion in North Carolina, standing in for Ric Flair, who had just been injured in a plane crash.

World Wide Wrestling Federation and return to NWA (1975–1976) 
Graham made his in–ring debut in the World Wide Wrestling Federation (WWWF) on October 25, 1975, in a tag-team match at the Boston Garden in which he and Spiros Arion defeated WWWF Heavyweight Champion Bruno Sammartino and Dominic De Nucci. At this time The Grand Wizard became Graham's manager. Another major feud at this time was with Polish muscleman Ivan Putski.

A brief contract with the NWA in Houston, Texas followed from June to August 1976, after which Graham went on his second tour of Japan, this time accompanied by Ivan Koloff. He feuded with Antonio Inoki during this Japanese run. After returning to America, Graham and Koloff made an unsuccessful attempt to launch their own wrestling promotion in Southern California. In November 1976, on the invitation of Dusty Rhodes, Graham joined the NWA promotion in Florida, beating Rhodes for the Florida heavyweight title on November 22 at the West Palm Beach Auditorium. His work in this period included occasional visits to St Louis, Missouri, where he took on NWA World Heavyweight Champion Harley Race.

Return to WWWF (1977–1978) 

Graham returned to the WWWF in April 1977 after an agreement with promoter Vincent J. McMahon "Senior". Graham defeated Bruno Sammartino for the WWWF Heavyweight Championship on April 30, 1977, in Baltimore, Maryland. Graham held the title for nine and a half months.

During his reign, he wrestled across America and in Japan (February 1978), facing challengers such as former champion Bruno Sammartino, Jack Brisco, Dusty Rhodes, Pedro Morales, Don Muraco, Mil Mascaras, Strong Kobayashi, Carlos Rocha and Riki Choshu. He would also resume his feud with Ivan Putski. On 25 January 1978 in Miami, Florida at the Orange Bowl football stadium, Graham wrestled against then-NWA World Heavyweight Champion Harley Race in a WWWF World Heavyweight Championship vs. NWA World Heavyweight Championship unification match which ended in a one-hour time-limit draw. Although a defeat by Bob Backlund, who was to embody the virtuous "all-American" wrestler, had been written into Graham's current contract with the WWWF, Graham suggested another outcome to McMahon: that Ivan Koloff should turn on him, thus starting a feud that would make Graham a fan favorite. McMahon refused because of the handshake deal to make Backlund the new fan favorite champion and he did not want to go back on his word. It was also unheard of for a counter-cultural character like Graham to be a fan favorite, because McMahon and many old promoters saw Graham as a confirmed heel and therefore a negative role model. Graham eventually lost the title to Backlund on February 20, 1978.

Another feud Graham had as champion was with Dusty Rhodes, which culminated in a Texas Bullrope match. His confrontations with Rhodes continued after Graham had been forced to drop the belt to Backlund. Rhodes himself, a long-time friend of Graham's, recalled these matches with Graham in 1978 as among the most exciting and memorable of his career.

Return to NWA (1978–1982) 
Disillusioned by the loss of his belt, Graham left the WWWF in December 1978 and accepted an offer to join Paul Boesch's promotion in Houston, Texas, lending himself out for other NWA events in California and Florida as well. In April 1979 he embarked on his third IWA tour of Japan, where he wrestled the same men he had worked with in 1974. On October 8, 1979, Graham became the Continental Wrestling Association (CWA) World Champion. On November 8, 1979 Graham lost the belt to Jerry Lawler in Lexington, Kentucky. His following NWA engagements in Kentucky, Tennessee, Georgia and Texas became fewer and rarer until he stopped wrestling in April 1980. Graham wrestled only two matches (one in Canada and one in Los Angeles) in the whole of 1981. He spent some time competing in Japan in 1982, where he added some martial arts techniques to his repertoire.

Second return to WWF (1982–1983) 

Graham returned to the now renamed World Wrestling Federation (WWF) in September 1982. He debuted in the promotion with an entirely new look: lean, with a bald head and mustache, and sporting black karate pants. Graham later stated that he wanted to retire the "Superstar" character out of frustration with Vince McMahon Sr. for not letting him become a fan favorite. After his return, he attacked Backlund, destroying his championship belt. He challenged Backlund for the WWF Championship, but was unable to win the title. He left the promotion in April 1983.

Return to AWA and third return to NWA (1983–1986) 
Graham signed up with the AWA again in October 1983, wrestling mainly in the Mid West. By the following year he had regained his earlier body weight and in April 1984 he began his NWA run with Championship Wrestling from Florida, first as a member of Kevin Sullivan's Army of Darkness and later as the group's opponent after he tired of Sullivan's abuse of his valet, The Lock, and stopped Sullivan from beating her at ringside. From November 1984 Graham joined Jim Crockett Promotions (Mid-Atlantic Wrestling) in North Carolina, working for Paul Jones in his feud against Jimmy Valiant. It was during this stint, in the summer of 1985, that Graham bulked up further, and returned to his tie-dyed look, growing a full goatee and dyeing the mustache blond.

Third return to the WWF (1986–1989) 
Graham returned to the WWF one more time in June 1986, now as a fan favorite. After a few appearances, it was diagnosed in August that he required a hip replacement. The footage of Graham's hip replacement surgery was shown on WWF TV on September 27 as a means of promoting his comeback. He returned in mid-1987 and worked a heavy schedule from mid July to late October, feuding with Harley Race and Butch Reed. However, the strain on his hip as well as his ankles also deteriorating proved to be too much. In Syracuse on October 27, the One Man Gang supposedly retired him from active competition permanently with a running splash on the concrete floor after Graham's win over Reed. In this incident, aired on the November 14, 1987 episode of Superstars, Don Muraco came to Graham's aid, and Graham subsequently became Muraco's manager. Graham's last wrestling match, also against Butch Reed and at 44 years of age, actually took place on November 7, 1987, in St Louis, Missouri. Over the next year, in between bouts of surgery, Graham worked for the WWF as a commentator.

Fourth return to WWE (2004–2009) 
On March 14, 2004, Graham was inducted into the WWE Hall of Fame class of 2004, the night before WrestleMania XX, by then-World Heavyweight Champion Triple H, whom Graham had helped inspire to become a professional wrestler. Graham later sold his WWE Hall of Fame ring to purchase anti-rejection medications to help treat his liver transplant.

Several months later, Graham joined WWE on a swing of nine televised events where he was interviewed by Jonathan Coachman (on December 28) before performing a skit which ended with Coachman getting knocked out. On February 25, 2005, Graham appeared at another live event and was again interviewed by Coachman before knocking him out. Three days later, Graham appeared on Raw, where he encouraged Randy Orton to do something to make himself notable. On October 3 at WWE Homecoming, Graham participated in a Legends Ceremony with 24 other WWE legends. On the January 23, 2006 episode of Raw, he promoted his book and DVD. Graham parted ways with WWE in 2009.

Fifth return to WWE (2015–present)
In November 2015, Graham announced that he had signed a legends contract (a long-term deal to make infrequent, non-wrestling appearances) in a Facebook post. The legends  deal was announced to be renewed again in 2021.

Legacy 
Roberta Morgan's 1979 kayfabe book Main Event stated, "Although he is a rule bender, [Graham] has managed to stay very popular with the fans, probably because of his skill, strength, and colorful personality". As a headliner in Madison Square Garden, which was the WWF's primary arena throughout his tenure, Graham sold out 19 of 20 shows.

Many wrestlers have based their looks and styles on Billy Graham. Some examples are Ric Flair, Austin Idol, Steve Austin, Scott Steiner, Triple H, Hulk Hogan and Jesse "The Body" Ventura. Graham was also famous for his characteristic use of the word "brother" in his promos, referring to either commentators or fellow wrestlers. This stems from his background attending evangelical revival meetings, where everybody referred to each other as "brother" or "sister" (in Christ). Graham's use of the word caught on, and since then countless wrestlers have also used "brother" in their own respective promos, most notably Hulk Hogan.

Graham has often lectured young athletes on the dangers of steroids. His autobiography, Tangled Ropes, was released by WWE on January 10, 2006. WWE also released a DVD about Graham's career, titled 20 Years Too Soon: The "Superstar" Billy Graham Story. Graham had a new DVD released in 2013 through Hannibal Pro Wrestling and Seriocity Productions titled "Superstar" Billy Graham: Full Disclosure.

Disputes with the McMahons 
In the early 1990s, U.S. federal agents were investigating Dr. George Zahorian, a Harrisburg, Pennsylvania physician who had been dispensing anabolic steroids and other drugs to wrestlers at WWF events. In 1991, Dr. Zahorian was convicted under the U.S. federal Anti-Drug Abuse Act of 1988 which prohibited the prescription of steroids for non-therapeutic purposes. This led to WWF owner Vince McMahon Jr., who admitted to being a steroid user himself, being put on trial on charges of steroid distribution in 1994. The trial concluded with McMahon's acquittal. During this time Graham personally sued Zahorian and the WWF, claiming that they had forced him to take steroids to maintain his position in the company. His lawsuit was unsuccessful, partly because he had been using steroids for a decade preceding his WWF debut.  Recalling the lawsuit on a 2003 episode of WWE Confidential, he attributed the litigation to his bitterness and claimed that he was an innovator of steroid use in the organization.

Graham went on a public awareness campaign regarding the dangers of steroids during this time, including an appearance with McMahon on The Phil Donahue Show in 1992. During the Donahue taping Graham claimed to have witnessed WWF officials sexually abuse children. McMahon claimed the abuse had never taken place, and Graham later admitted that he made up the allegations, hoping to extort "hush money" out of the WWF. In his autobiography, Graham describes making the allegations as being "my most shameful moment, not only in the wrestling profession, but in my life". Graham wrote an apology to McMahon but received no response until his 2002 liver transplant.

Five years after being inducted into the WWE Hall of Fame, Graham was released from his consultancy position in WWE. He sold his Hall of Fame ring on eBay to help pay for medical bills and requested that he be entirely removed from the Hall of Fame after Abdullah the Butcher was inducted. Graham complained that Abdullah had never wrestled in the promotion. Abdullah did however wrestle for the WWWF in 1972.

Graham spoke out against Linda McMahon during her 2010 Senate campaign, claiming that she was distancing herself from the racy programming that she profited from while acting as CEO for WWE. Upon learning that his liver condition had worsened, Graham reached out to apologize to the McMahons, even offering to be a spokesman for Linda McMahon's campaign.

In July 2015, Graham sent a letter to Vince McMahon requesting to take the position of Dusty Rhodes, who had recently died, at NXT. Graham received criticism from fans due to his timing and opportunism. He defended himself, calling his critics "evil subhumans", and compared a possible reconciliation with McMahon to that of long-time WWE critic Bruno Sammartino, who reconciled with McMahon and was inducted into the WWE Hall of Fame class of 2013.

Personal life

Family 
As stated in his autobiography Tangled Ropes, Graham and his wife Valerie, whom he married in 1978, were never able to have children. Graham has two children from a previous marriage to Madelyn Miluso. His daughter Capella was born on June 8, 1972. She was named after a star he read about in the Atlas of the Universe. His son Joey was born on March 18, 1975. Joey was born with double pneumonia and an enlarged heart, which was later surgically corrected. His godfather was wrestler Dusty Rhodes.

Health 
Graham received a liver transplant in 2002 from a 26-year-old female donor, who had died in a car crash. Graham had cirrhosis at the time of his transplant. Graham was again hospitalized on May 24, 2006, due to a bowel obstruction from an earlier surgery.

In July 2010, Graham was hospitalized due to liver problems. Afterward, he announced that he probably only had one year left to live without another liver transplant. Graham reserved a burial spot at the Green Acres cemetery in Scottsdale, Arizona, next to Eddie Guerrero. On March 31, 2011, The Phoenix New Times reported that Graham's doctor, Hector Rodriguez-Luna, acknowledged that Graham's advanced fibrosis may be early cirrhosis and that he could live for two more years if he took Interferon—a drug to help slow his hepatitis C—and stayed in shape. By 2012, Graham was diagnosed with third-stage liver disease and cirrhosis.

On January 17, 2013, Graham was hospitalized with double pneumonia and possible heart failure. He was re-hospitalized for a liver complication in October 2014.

On August 2, 2016, Graham was hospitalized while undergoing a medical procedure due to internal bleeding; he underwent surgery on August 3 to identify the cause of the issues.

In August 2022, Billy Graham had his toes amputated. In January 2023, Graham was hospitalized after being diagnosed with an ear and skull infection.

Championships and accomplishments 
 50th State Big Time Wrestling
 NWA Hawaii Heavyweight Championship (1 time)
 Championship Wrestling from Florida
 NWA Florida Heavyweight Championship (2 times)
 NWA Florida Tag Team Championship (1 time) – with Ox Baker
 NWA Southern Heavyweight Championship (Florida version) (1 time)
 Continental Wrestling Association
 CWA World Heavyweight Championship (1 time)
 International Pro Wrestling
 IWA World Heavyweight Championship (1 time)
 NWA Big Time Wrestling
 NWA Brass Knuckles Championship (Texas version) (4 times)
 NWA San Francisco
 NWA World Tag Team Championship (San Francisco version) (1 time) – with Pat Patterson
 Pro Wrestling Illustrated
 Most Hated Wrestler of the Year (1973)
 Match of the Year (1977) 
 Match of the Year (1978) 
 Ranked No. 277 of the top 500 singles wrestlers of the "PWI Years" in 2003
 Pro Wrestling This Week
 Wrestler of the Week (June 1–6, 1987)
 Professional Wrestling Hall of Fame and Museum
 Class of 2009
 World (Wide) Wrestling Federation / Entertainment
 WWWF Heavyweight Championship (1 time)
 WWE Hall of Fame (Class of 2004)
 Slammy Award (1 time)
 Hulk Hogan Real American Award (1987)
 Wrestling Observer Newsletter
 Most Washed Up Wrestler (1982)
 Best Pro Wrestling Book (2006) with Keith Greenberg
 Wrestling Observer Newsletter Hall of Fame (Class of 1996)

References

External links 

 
 
 
 Just Sports Stats
 

1943 births
20th-century professional wrestlers
American bodybuilders
American color commentators
American football defensive linemen
American male professional wrestlers
American players of Canadian football
Canadian football defensive linemen
Liver transplant recipients
Living people
Montreal Alouettes players
NWA Florida Heavyweight Champions
NWA Southern Heavyweight Champions (Florida version)
People from Paradise Valley, Arizona
Players of American football from Arizona
Professional wrestlers from Arizona
Professional wrestling announcers
Professional Wrestling Hall of Fame and Museum
Professional wrestling managers and valets
Professional wrestling trainers
Sportspeople from Phoenix, Arizona
Stampede Wrestling alumni
WWE Champions
WWE Hall of Fame inductees
WCWA Brass Knuckles Champions